Regulatory factor X, 6 also known as DNA-binding protein RFX6 is a protein that in humans is encoded by the RFX6 gene.

Function 

The nuclear protein encoded by this gene is a member of the regulatory factor X (RFX) family of transcription factors. Studies in mice suggest that this gene is specifically required for the differentiation of islet cells for the production of insulin, but not for the differentiation of pancreatic polypeptide-producing cells. It regulates the transcription factors involved in beta-cell maturation and function, thus, restricting the expression of the beta-cell differentiation and specification genes.

Clinical significance 

Mutations in this gene are associated with Mitchell-Riley syndrome, which is characterized by neonatal diabetes with pancreatic hypoplasia, duodenal and jejunal atresia, and gall bladder agenesis.

References

Further reading 
 
 
 
 
 
 

Transcription factors